Pipizini is a tribe of small to medium-sized generally black hoverflies, although some species also have orange spots on their abdomen. This nondescript colouring can lead to some species being confused with other dark hoverflies from other tribes. The lack of a facial knob is a good defining feature which separates them from most of these other hoverflies. As with other species in the subfamily Syrphinae the larvae feed on aphids though there seems to be a preference for wax-secreting aphids e.g. Pemphigidae.

List of genera 
Heringia Rondani, 1856
Pipiza Fallén, 1810
Pipizella Rondani, 1856
Trichopsomyia Williston, 1888
Triglyphus Loew, 1840

References

Diptera of Europe
Pipizinae
Brachycera tribes